The Mystery of Mazo de la Roche is a 2012 Canadian biographical film written and directed by Maya Gallus.

Cast 
 Deborah Hay as Caroline Clement
 Jordyn Negri as Young Mazo
 Severn Thompson as Mazo de la Roche

External links 
 

2012 documentary films
Documentary films about women writers
National Film Board of Canada documentaries
2012 films
2010s English-language films
2010s Canadian films